Chahar Gav may refer to:
 Chahar Gav Bandi, Kerman Province
 Chahar Gav, Khuzestan
 Chahar Gav, Kurdistan